"Angel" is a song by American singer Madonna from her second studio album Like a Virgin (1984). It was released on April 10, 1985 by Sire Records as the album's third single. Written by Madonna and Steve Bray, it was one of the first songs developed for the project and, according to Madonna, was inspired by a girl who is saved by an angel, and she falls in love with him. "Angel" was released as a 12-inch single with "Into the Groove" in some countries and charted likewise. Despite its relative success, "Angel" was one of the few Madonna singles from that time that did not have an official music video, because although it was planned, it was canceled due to the artist's busy schedule. Instead, a promotional clip comprising segments of her previous videos was released in the United Kingdom.

Musically "Angel" consists of three chord ascending hook, which serves for the verse and chorus. It has vocal harmonies beneath the main chorus and the lyrics repeat the angel-like image of Madonna's saviour. Critical response to the song varied, with some music critics calling it a classic and others deeming it sub-par compared to Madonna's previous singles. "Angel" became the singer's fifth consecutive top-five single on the US Billboard Hot 100 and reached the top of its dance charts. It was also able to reach number-one in Australia and the top-five of the charts in Canada, Ireland, Japan, New Zealand, Spain and the United Kingdom. Madonna has performed the song only once, on the Virgin Tour in 1985. The song was used at the soundtrack of the third season of Stranger Things.

Recording and release
"Angel" was written by Madonna and Stephen Bray and released worldwide on April 10, 1985. The song first began as a demo and was recorded as early as April 1984 for her second studio album, Like a Virgin. However, the whole project was held off, much to Madonna's frustration, by the continuing sales of her self-titled debut album, which had by then sold over a million copies in United States. She had decided to release "Angel" as the initial single from the album, but changed her mind, after the recording of the title track "Like a Virgin" was complete. "Angel" was an ode to "a heavenly love" and inspired from Madonna's Catholic upbringing with the singer saying, "I think it's important to call angels to you to protect you... That's part of the ritualistic moment. The calling of angels." The track was ultimately released as the third single, and included the song "Into the Groove", from Madonna's 1985 film Desperately Seeking Susan, on the B-side of the 12-inch maxi-single.

Madonna had initially planned to release a music video for "Angel", but later decided to go against it, as at that time, there were already five Madonna music videos on-rotation in the music channels and were being broadcast continuously. Hence, Warner Bros. and Madonna felt that adding another video to the already saturated channels, might not be in her favour. A promotional video, containing scenes from the music videos of "Burning Up", "Borderline", "Lucky Star", "Like a Virgin" and "Material Girl" was made by Warner Bros. Records and aired in the United Kingdom. The video was included on the promotional-only video compilations It's That Girl and She's Breathless.

Composition

"Angel" begins with a laugh and an echo, panning from left to the right. The song is built on an ascending hook consisting of three chord sequence, which serves for the verse and chorus. It consists of a constant 8th rhythm throughout the song, making it sound similar to the songs of the band Machine. Vocal harmonies are also added beneath the main chorus. It is a two-bar phrase song, and laughter is again added as the song slowly fades out. Madonna sings in her lower register at the beginning, and shifts to the higher one in the line "I can see it in your e-e-e-eyye-e-s". The line was taken from the song "Death Disco" (1979), by the British musical group Public Image Ltd. According to the sheet music published at Musicnotes.com, by Alfred Publishing, the song is set in common time, with a medium tempo of 133 beats per minute. It is composed in the key of G major, with Madonna's voice spanning from the  low-note of G4 to the high-note of B5. The song has a basic sequence of Am–Bm–C as its chord progression. The lyrics continuously repeat the angel-like image of Madonna's savior.

Critical reception
Rikky Rooksby, author of Madonna: The Complete Guide to Her Music, commented that "Angel" is a song "that is less than even the sum of its parts". Santiago Fouz-Hernández and Freya Jarman-Ivens, authors of Madonna's Drowned Worlds: New Approaches to Her Cultural Transformations, felt that "the pizzicato synthesizer line that opens 'Angel' was indeed classical Madonna". John Leland from Spin called it a rehash of Madonna's previous single "Lucky Star" (1984), with "an even lamer melody and punch. [...] 'Angel' is Nile Rodgers doing what he does best: turning crass product into cash product". Stephen Thomas Erlewine from AllMusic called the song "excellent standard-issue dance-pop". Sal Cinquemani from Slant Magazine called the song sugary. Also from Slant Magazine, Eric Henderson opined it was "the ultimate “this is better than I remember it” single of Madonna’s career, 'Angel' is best half-remembered, the better by which to keep rediscovering it again and again".

Billboards Joe Lynch deemed it a "a sadly undervalued gem from her second album [...] this ineffably charming dance-pop lark also features some of Madge's cutest come-ons". Also from Billboard, Nancy Erlich called the song "romantic, uncontroversial techno-pop. [...] [Madonna's] reign continues as '85's premier media obsession".  Cash Box said "Less here to hold on to than the LP’s title track or 'Material Girl' but still right up the commercial alley." While reviewing Like a Virgin in 1995, Dave Karger from Entertainment Weekly felt that the song comes off as a bit repetitious and immature. Alfred Soto of Stylus Magazine commented that "'Angel' is a particular stunner, certainly the apex of Rodgers' post-Chic skills. [...] It does a better job than the two big singles of delineating the boundaries of Madonna's determined shallowness, an act that confounds Philistines today and made the appreciation of her musical skills a lot harder than it took these critics to dismiss Cyndi Lauper as the real charlatan". From The Guardian, Jude Rogers felt it was "an early pass at religious-ecstasy pop, but needing bigger wings".

Chart performance
After its release, "Angel" debuted on the Billboard Hot 100 at number 48 on the issue dated April 27, 1985, while her previous single "Crazy for You" was at number-two on the chart. After ten weeks, "Angel" reached a peak position of five on the chart. The song tied Madonna with Olivia Newton-John, as the female artist with the most consecutive top-five hits on the Hot 100 at that time. "Angel" debuted on the Adult Contemporary chart for the issue dated May 11, 1985, and reached a peak of five. The song debuted at number 40 on the Hot Dance Club Songs chart on June 1, 1985, and reached the top after three weeks. It also charted on a number of Billboard charts, such as reaching the top of the Hot Dance Singles Sales and the Hot R&B/Hip-Hop Songs chart at position 71. On July 30, 1985, "Angel" and "Into the Groove" were together certified gold by the Recording Industry Association of America (RIAA) for the shipment of one million copies across United States—the requirement for a gold single prior to 1989. It was the first 12-inch single to be certified gold, since Frankie Smith's "Double Dutch Bus" (1981). "Angel/Into the Groove" placed at number 81 on the year-end chart for 1985, with Madonna becoming the top pop artist for the year.

In Canada, the song debuted at number 80 on the RPM issue dated May 4, 1985. After eight weeks, the song reached a peak of five on the chart. "Angel" was present on the chart for 25 weeks and ranked at number 56 on the 1985 RPM Year-end chart. The song was released in the United Kingdom with "Burning Up" as its B-Side, and debuted at number ten on the UK Singles Chart on September 9, 1985. It reached a peak of five next week, and was present for a total of 12 weeks on the chart. According to the Official Charts Company, the song has sold 205,000 copies there. In Australia, "Angel" charted as a combined single with "Into the Groove" and topped the Kent Music Report chart for four weeks. It was the second highest selling single of 1985 in Australia. The song reached the top 20 in the charts of Belgium, Ireland, Netherlands, New Zealand, Spain, Switzerland and the European Hot 100 Singles.

Live performance
The song was performed as part of Madonna's 1985 Virgin Tour; it was the fifth song of the setlist. Madonna wore a blue see-through crop-top, revealing her characteristic black bra. She also had lacy leggings and crucifixes around an ear and her neck. As she finished the vigorous performance of "Everybody", the lights were dimmed and the introduction music of the song started. Rotating lights fell on the stage. Madonna appeared sitting on top of the stairs and gradually descended. During the intermediate bridge, she and her dancers moved energetically around the whole stage, as white balloons fell on them from above. Madonna continued singing as the lights were dimmed again. She finished the performance and disappeared behind the wings for a costume change. "Angel" did not appear in the final home video release Madonna Live: The Virgin Tour.

Track listing and formats

 US and Australian 7-inch single
"Angel" (radio edit) – 3:40
"Angel" (dance mix edit) – 4:56

 US and Australian 12-inch single
"Angel" (extended dance remix) – 6:15
"Into the Groove" (single version) – 4:43

 UK and European 7-inch single
"Angel" (edit) – 3:40
"Burning Up" (alternate version) – 4:48

 UK and European 12-inch single
"Angel" (extended dance remix) – 6:15
"Burning Up" (alternate version) – 4:48

NOTE: The alternate version of "Burning Up" is the original (LP version) that was released on Madonna (1983); it was replaced later with the (3:45) version.

Personnel
Personnel are adapted from the album and 7-inch European single liner notes.

 Madonna – lead vocals, backing vocals
 Rob Sabino – synthesizers, synth bass 
 Nile Rodgers – guitars
 Jimmy Bralower – drum programming
 Curtis King – backing vocals
 Frank Simms – backing vocals
 George Simms – backing vocals

Production credits
 Madonna – writer
 Stephen Bray – writer
 Nile Rodgers – producer 
 Herb Ritts – photography
 Jeri McManus – design

Charts

Weekly charts

Year-end charts

Certification and sales

See also
 List of number-one singles in Australia during the 1980s
 List of number-one dance singles of 1985 (U.S.)

References

Bibliography

External links
"Angel" on Spotify

1984 songs
1985 singles
Madonna songs
Number-one singles in Australia
Song recordings produced by Nile Rodgers
Songs written by Madonna
Songs written by Stephen Bray
Sire Records singles
Warner Records singles